Julius Lippmann (22 July 1864 – 13 November 1934) was a German liberal politician, a member of the Prussian Parliament and the Weimar National Assembly. He served as governor of the Province of Pomerania from 1919 to 1930.

Lippmann was born in Danzig, West Prussia, German Empire (Gdańsk, Poland), his father was a Jewish cantor in the Jewish Community of Danzig. Lippmann attended the Academic Gymnasium Danzig and started to study classical philology at the University of Berlin, but soon switched to law.

Lippmann started to practise as a lawyer in Stettin (Szczecin) in 1892, as a member of the Free-minded Union he was elected to the town council of Stettin in 1900. He became a member of the Prussian House of Representatives in 1908 and joined the Progressive People's Party (DDP) in 1910. He was the deputy chairman of the DDP fraction in the Prussian Parliament. Lippmann was elected a member of the Weimar National Assembly on 19 January 1919. On 1 April 1919 he followed Georg Michaelis as "Oberpräsident" (governor) of the Province of Pomerania, the only liberal politician to hold this position.

In 1927 Lippmann became honorary senator of the University of Greifswald, he retired on 31 March 1930 as Oberpräsident and started to lecture on administrative sciences in Greifswald later that year. Though Lippmann had converted to Lutheranism, he was attacked by Nazi students for his Jewish descent. In April 1933 Lippmann ceased his lectures and was formally dismissed on 25 July 1933 on his own demand after he had received a Law for the Restoration of the Professional Civil Service questionnaire.

Facing further anti-semitic persecution Lippmann moved to Berlin, where he died in 1934.

References

1864 births
1934 deaths
German people of Jewish descent
Converts to Lutheranism from Judaism
Politicians from Gdańsk
People from West Prussia
Humboldt University of Berlin alumni
Academic staff of the University of Greifswald
German jurists
Free-minded Union politicians
Progressive People's Party (Germany) politicians
German Democratic Party politicians
Members of the Prussian House of Representatives
Members of the Weimar National Assembly